Luka Vuksanović (born 15 March 1995) is a Serbian professional basketball player.

After spending a season and a half for his hometown's Sloga, he signed for Metalac on 26 December 2014.

References

External links 
 Profile at abaliga.com
 Profile at eurobasket.com
 Profile at realgm.com

1995 births
Living people
ABA League players
Basketball League of Serbia players
KK Metalac Valjevo players
KK Sloga players
KK Jagodina players
Serbian men's basketball players
Sportspeople from Kraljevo
Small forwards
Shooting guards